Arthur S. Goldsmith (February 26, 1909 - February 3, 1995) was an American bridge player. Goldsmith is from Lyndhurst, Ohio. He graduated from Yale University and received a J.D. from Western Reserve University.

Bridge accomplishments

Wins

 North American Bridge Championships (5)
 Marcus Cup (1) 1951 
 Mitchell Board-a-Match Teams (3) 1947, 1954, 1958 
 Spingold (1) 1949

Runners-up

 North American Bridge Championships
 Open Pairs (1928-1962) (1) 1944 
 Reisinger (2) 1949, 1952 
 Spingold (2) 1946, 1952

Notes

American contract bridge players
1909 births
1995 deaths
Yale University alumni
Case Western Reserve University alumni
People from Lyndhurst, Ohio